Words is the debut studio album by French singer F. R. David. Its title track, "Words", was a commercial success in Europe, reaching number one in ten countries across the continent, as well as peaking at No. 2 in the United Kingdom, France and Netherlands.

Track listing
 "Words" (Robert Fitoussi) – 3:31
 "Someone to Love" (Fitoussi, Daniel Darras, Richelle Dassin) – 3:28
 "Take Me Back" (Fitoussi, Darras) – 3:55
 "Pick Up the Phone" (Fitoussi, Richelle Dassin) – 3:10
 "Music" (Frédéric Leibovitz, Darras, Sam Choueka) – 3:13
 "Rocker Blues" (Fitoussi, Dassin) – 3:41
 "Givin' It Up" (Fitoussi, Pepin) – 3:19
 "He" (Fitoussi, Pepin, Dassin) – 3:13
 "Porcelain Eyes" (Darras, Fitoussi) – 2:41
 "Can't Get Enough" (Fitoussi, Pepin, Dassin) – 4:00

Personnel
Bass – Gilles Douieb, Michel Assa
Design, photography – Richard Charpagne
Drum programming – Joël Fajerman
Electronic drums – Benjamin Cohen, Roger Rizzitelli
Guitar – Patrice Tison
Keyboards, saxophone, arrangements, engineering – Daniel Darras
Mixing – Dominique Poncet
Producer – Jean-Michel Gallois-Montbrun
Producer, arrangements – Frédéric Leibovitz
Rhythm guitar, vocals, arrangements – F.R. David

Charts

References

1982 debut albums
Carrere Records albums